The Ivanychi light railway (historical name: Feldbahn Iwaniczy–Raczyn) was an approximately  long light railway with a track gauge of  from Ivanychi via Pavlivka, Rachyn, Horokhiv, Stoianiv and Tartakiv to Sokal in Volhynia (now in the Volyn Oblast and Lviv Oblast in Ukraine), which operated in parts at least from 1915 to 1928.

Operation 
The light railway, which was used for military purposes during World War I, was operated to transport military materiel (weapons, ammunition, building materials, fodder and food) as well as troops and wounded men. Both wooden and metal carriages were hauled by horses and steam locomotives on the almost level track.

The light railway was operated by soldiers of the Austro-Hungarian Army and the German Army. During Alexander von Linsingen's reorganisation of the army groups in December 1916, the Austro-Hungarian corps were merged with the 'Raczyn Section' (German 108th Infantry Division, 224th Infantry Division, 2nd Guards Cavalry Brigade) to form the 'Luga Section' under General of the Cavalry Georg von der Marwitz.

Rolling stock 

The following steam locomotives were used on the light railway:

Borsig, No. 6152/1907, E. Bernhard, Berlin for Camburg
Henschel, No. 9698/1909, Gerätevereinigung, Cologne
O&K, No. 5223/1912, Jacob Gorges, Rastenberg
Henschel, No. 12464/1913, R. Dolberg, Hamburg
Maffei, No. 3927/1917, central transport management, Vienna

Four historic photos of the locally converted wagons with German labels are preserved in the ETH Library of the ETH Zurich.

External links 
 Approximate route of the track on Google Maps

See also 
 Iwanowo light railway

References 

	

Narrow gauge railways in Ukraine
Volyn Oblast
Military railways